The 2016–17 Kaohsiung Truth season was the franchise's first and only season. They competed in the ASEAN Basketball League (ABL). The Truth were coached by Tryston Lawrence. The Truth played their home games at Kaohsiung Municipal Kaohsiung Senior High School Gymnasium.

On December 18, 2016, the Truth parted ways with Tryston Lawrence and named Sabatino Chen as their new head coach.

Standings

Roster

Game log

Exhibition game

Regular season 

|- style="background:#fcc;"
| 1
| November 27
| Hong Kong Eastern Long Lions
| L 79-90
| Hall, Hsu, Oliver (20)
| Hall, Oliver (14)
| Derek Hall (4)
| KSHS Gymnasium
| 0-1

|- style="background:#fcc;"
| 2
| December 1
| @Hong Kong Eastern Long Lions
| L 67-95
| Cedric Oliver (23)
| Derek Hall (25)
| Cedric Oliver (3)
| Southorn Stadium
| 0-2
|- style="background:#fcc;"
| 3
| December 4
| @Alab Pilipinas
| L 82-91
| Wesley Hsu (23)
| Derek Hall (18)
| Cedric Oliver (3) 
| Baliwag Star Arena
| 0-3
|- style="background:#fcc;"
| 4
| December 11
| @Alab Pilipinas
| L 87-93
| Cedric Oliver (23)
| Derek Hall (15)
| Achie Iñigo (8)
| Olivarez College Gymnasium
| 0-4

|- style="background:#cfc;"
| 5
| January 7
| Saigon Heat
| W 83-82
| Cedric Oliver (25)
| Cedric Oliver (13)
| Cedric Oliver (4)
| KSHS Gymnasium
| 1-4
|- style="background:#fcc;"
| 6
| January 8
| Alab Pilipinas
| L 77-86
| Derek Hall (31)
| Derek Hall (16)
| Cedric Oliver (8)
| KSHS Gymnasium
| 1-5
|- style="background:#fcc;"
| 7
| January 14
| @Saigon Heat
| L 85-99
| Cedric Oliver (24)
| Derek Hall (11)
| Achie Iñigo (3)
| CIS Arena
| 1-6
|- style="background:#cfc;"
| 8
| January 25
| @Westports Malaysia Dragons
| W 97-79
| Wesley Hsu (23)
| Cedric Oliver (16)
| Cedric Oliver (10)
| House of Champions, Gem-In Mall
| 2-6

|- style="background:#cfc;"
| 9
| February 1
| Saigon Heat
| W 85-71
| Derek Hall (22)
| Cedric Oliver (10)
| Cedric Oliver (6)
| KSHS Gymnasium
| 3-6
|- style="background:#fcc;"
| 10
| February 3
| Singapore Slingers
| L 66-84
| Cedric Oliver (23)
| Cedric Oliver (10)
| Wang Hsin-Kai (3)
| KSHS Gymnasium
| 3-7
|- style="background:#cfc;"
| 11
| February 5
| Westports Malaysia Dragons
| W 94-86
| Cedric Oliver (24)
| Derek Hall (17)
| Derek Hall (5)
| KSHS Gymnasium
| 4-7
|- style="background:#fcc;"
| 12
| February 11
| @Saigon Heat
| L 76-85
| Cedric Oliver (22)
| Cedric Oliver (16)
| Cedric Oliver (4)
| CIS Arena
| 4-8
|- style="background:#cfc;"
| 13
| February 19
| Singapore Slingers
| W 79-75
| Derek Hall (20)
| Derek Hall (13)
| Derek Hall (5)
| KSHS Gymnasium
| 5-8
|- style="background:#fcc;"
| 14
| February 22
| @Hong Kong Eastern Long Lions
| L 83-103
| Derek Hall (20)
| Cedric Oliver (4)
| Derek Hall (20)
| Southorn Stadium
| 5-9
|- style="background:#fcc;"
| 15
| February 26
| @Singapore Slingers
| L 76-84
| Cedric Oliver (19)
| Cedric Oliver (15)
| Cedric Oliver (5)
| OCBC Arena
| 5-10

|- style="background:#fcc;"
| 16
| March 5
| Hong Kong Eastern Long Lions
| L 75-89
| Derek Hall (22)
| Derek Hall (16)
| Luo Jun-Quan (3)
| KSHS Gymnasium
| 5-11
|- style="background:#fcc;"
| 17
| March 12
| @Singapore Slingers
| L 52-76
| Derek Hall (18)
| Derek Hall (11)
| Jay Wey (3)
| OCBC Arena
| 5-12
|- style="background:#fcc;"
| 18
| March 18
| @Westports Malaysia Dragons
| L 78-103
| Raymar Jose (25)
| Derek Hall (11)
| Derek Hall (2)
| House of Champions, Gem-In Mall
| 5-13
|- style="background:#fcc;"
| 19
| March 25
| Westports Malaysia Dragons
| L 108-114
| Cedric Oliver (35)
| Cedric Oliver (16)
| Luo Jun-Quan (8)
| KSHS Gymnasium
| 5-14
|- style="background:#fcc;"
| 20
| March 26
| Alab Pilipinas
| L 85-107
| Cedric Oliver (17)
| Cedric Oliver (11)
| Cedric Oliver (4)
| KSHS Gymnasium
| 5-15

Player Statistics 
<noinclude>

Regular season

 Reference：

Transactions

Additions

Subtractions

Awards

Players of the Week

References 

Kaohsiung Truth season
Formosa Dreamers Season, 2017-18